Nakamichi is a Japanese consumer electronics brand.

Nakamichi may also refer to:

Nakamichi, Yamanashi, a former town in Higashiyatsushiro District, Yamanashi Prefecture, Japan

People with the surname
Etsuro Nakamichi (died 1982), Japanese businessman
, Japanese volleyball player
, Japanese rugby union player

Japanese-language surnames